Hoffmann van Heerden Maritz (born 29 March 1989) is a South African rugby union player who most recently played for the . He is a utility back that can play as full-back, winger or centre.

Career

Youth rugby

Senior rugby

He joined Nelspruit-based side  for 2015.

Representative rugby
He was selected for the South African Barbarians (North) team against  that toured South Africa as part of the 2012 mid-year rugby test series.

Later in 2013, he was included in a South Africa President's XV team to play in the 2013 IRB Tbilisi Cup, but later withdrew due to a knee injury.

References

South African rugby union players
Living people
1989 births
Golden Lions players
Leopards (rugby union) players
People from Bethlehem, Free State
Rugby union fullbacks
South Africa international rugby sevens players